The Koelsch radical (also known as Koelsch's radical and 1,3-bisdiphenylene-2-phenylallyl or α,γ-bisdiphenylene-β-phenylallyl, abbreviated BDPA) is a chemical compound that is an unusually stable carbon-centered radical, due to its resonance structures.

Properties
BDPA is an unusually stable radical compound due to the extent to which its electrons are delocalized through resonance structures. The unpaired electron is located predominantly at the 1 and 3 positions. Steric effects from the biphenyl substituents also contribute to the compound's stability.

Uses
BDPA and closely related compounds are used as molecular standards in electron paramagnetic resonance (EPR) and electron nuclear double resonance (ENDOR) experiments, and as a polarizing agent in dynamic nuclear polarization (DNP) nuclear magnetic resonance (NMR) experiments. Because BDPA itself is hydrophobic, derivatives have been developed that are more soluble in aqueous solution.

History
The compound was first synthesized by C. Frederick Koelsch while he was a postdoctoral fellow at Harvard University in the 1930s. He attempted to publish a paper describing the compound, but the paper was rejected on the grounds that the described properties, particularly stability, were unlikely to be those of a radical. Subsequent experimental evidence and quantum mechanics calculations suggested his interpretation of the original experiment was correct, resulting in the publication of the paper in 1957, nearly 25 years after the original experiments. Although the original report described stability on the order of years, modern experiments suggest that this family of compounds, while unusually stable for radicals, shows measurable degradation in months after preparation.

References

Aromatic compounds
Free radicals